Martín Sivak is an Argentinian journalist and author. His non-fiction books include works on the Bolivian Presidents Juan José Torres, Hugo Banzer and Evo Morales.

Books
 Evo Morales: The Extraordinary Rise of the First Indigenous President of Bolivia (2010), Palgrave Macmillan.
 Jefazo: Retrato Intimo De Evo Morales (2008)
 El Doctor:  Biografia No Autorizada de Mariano Grondona (2005), Aguilar. Biography of Mariano Grondona
 El dictador elegido: Biografía no autorizada de Hugo Banzer Suárez (2001), Plural Editores.
 El Asesinato De Juan José Torres: Banzer Y El Mercosur De La Muerte (1997), Ediciones Colihue SRL.

References

Living people
Argentine journalists
Male journalists
Year of birth missing (living people)